In music, Op. 71 stands for Opus number 71. Compositions that are assigned this number include:

 Albéniz – Rumores de la Caleta
 Arnold – Symphony No. 4
 Chopin – Polonaises, Op. 71
 Dvořák – Saint Ludmila
 Milhaud – Little Symphony No. 3
 Reger – Gesang der Verklärten
 Schumann – Adventlied for soprano, chorus and orchestra
 Sibelius – Scaramouche